The Basque alphabet is a Latin alphabet used to write the Basque language. It consists of 27 letters.

List of letters 
The letters of the Basque alphabet are the 26 letters of the ISO basic Latin alphabet plus .

This is the whole list, plus their corresponding phonemes in IPA:

All letters and digraphs represent unique phonemes.

 is silent in most regions but is pronounced in much of the Northeast, which is the main reason for its existence in the Basque alphabet.

Digraphs 
There are several digraphs (successive letters used to represent a single sound):

History 
For most of its history, Basque writers used the conventions of Romance languages like Spanish or French. Thus Pedro Agerre's 1643 book was titled Guero corresponding to modern  ("Later") and the 18th-century motto  would be  ("The three as one").

The present-day Standard Basque was developed in the second half of the 20th century, and has been set by rules of Euskaltzaindia (the Basque Language Academy). On the other hand, Basque speakers of the Northeast had to learn to write several words with fewer or no  letters, because usually a  used in their tradition was not taken into the Standard Basque orthography. These changes from the various traditions into the modern Standard Basque were proposed and accepted by the young generations of Basque writers, so the  controversy faded as the older generations died.

Letter frequencies 

The letter  is used:

1. In the Suletin (Zuberoan) dialect of Basque.

2. In standard Basque, it is used in geographical names from the Suletin dialect, e. g. Garrüze 'Garris, Pyrénées-Atlantiques', and their derivatives, e. g. garrüztar 'inhabitant of Garris'.

References

External links 
Basque language – English Pen
The Basque Alphabet

Alphabet
Latin alphabets